Brod nad Dyjí (until 1947 Kolenfurt) is a municipality and village in Břeclav District in the South Moravian Region of the Czech Republic. It has about 500 inhabitants.

Geography
Brod nad Dyjí lies in the Dyje–Svratka Valley. The village lies on the shores on the Nové Mlýny reservoirs.

Economy
Brod nad Dyjí is known for viticulture.

References

External links

 

Villages in Břeclav District